Lonand is a city and municipal council in Satara district, Maharashtra. It is 227km from Mumbai, 81km from Pune, 47km from Wai & Satara,179km from Sangli and 30km from Phaltan.

Geography 
It has an average elevation of 597 metres (1961 feet). Situated on the banks of Khemavati river at the border of Pune district and Satara district and Phaltan, Koregaon, Purandar Tehsil. Lonand comes under Khandala Tehsil.

Villages situated nearby Lonand: Nimbodi, Padali, Khed, Tambave, Kaapadgaon, Koregaon, Balupatlachi Wadi, Padegaon, Andori, Pimpre, Pargaon-Khandala.

Cities situated nearby Lonand: Phaltan, Baramati, Saswad, Jejuri, Wai, Satara, Pune

Features 
Major landmarks in the city include Punyaslok Ahilyadevi Chowk, Thombare mala, Bhise Vasti-Shirwal naka, Vinayakrao Shelke Patil vasti (Shelke Mala), Maitree Park (Jotiba Nagar), Station Chowk, Bajartal (Rajmata Chowk), Navi Peth, Juni bhaji Mandai, Kaalvat Mala, SP College Lonand, Market Yard (Krushi utpanna bajar samiti), Shelke Galli, Brahmin Ali,Mali Aali, Jambhalicha Mala, Gote Maal, Biroba Vasti, Indiranagar, Shivaji chowk, Umaji Naik Chowk, Punjab colony, Tanaji chowk, Lonand Bus Stand MIDC Lonand[1]

Lonand have Railway Junction.

How to reach 
You can visit Lonand by Train & road. It is about 227km from capital city of Mumbai. 81km from Pune, 47km from Satara. you can reach Wai city by road Lonand-Khandala-Wai. The Nation Highway 48 is 20km away from Lonand.

Transportation

National Highway & State Highway 
The National Highway 4 (now renowned as National Highway 48) goes 20km from Lonand city. The State Highway Satara-Lonand-Pune, Pune-Lonand-Phaltan-Pandharpur goes by Lonand.

Railways 

 Lonand Railway Station

Lonand has railway station and is onroute from Mumbai to Miraj, Pune, Satara Sangli, Kolhapur, and Bangalore (some trains). You can reach Lonand from Mumbai or Pune easily by road or rail (Mahalaxmi Express, Koyna Express,"Goa Express", Sahyadri Express or Chalukya Express).

Railway track from Lonand - Pandharpur & Lonand-Baramati are now in under progression and in same Recently Lonand-Phaltan train started as phase 1 of this project.

 Bus

 Lonand ST Bus Stand

Lonand is well connected to Pune, Satara, Phaltan, Baramati, Pandharpur, Shirwal, Khandala, Bhor, Wai, Wathar st.,

Economy 
Lonand is surrounded by a agriculture land, Lonand is famous for onion as (Lonand cha Kaanda). Lonand and nearby villages are leading producer of onion and sugarcane (Jaggery). wheat, bajara, maize, and jawar are also major farm crops. Farmers also produces all types of vegetables, grapes in large amount.

Lonand have a big Market place & Maharashtras second most largest Market Yard (Krushi Utpanna Bajar Samiti Lonand) after Nashik for onion.

All the showrooms, shops of large companies are available in Lonand.

Lonand has a Nagar Parishad (Municipal Council) which provides required facilities to peoples, and manage, rule, look into cultural and financial affairs and work for improvement & betterment of city. Sachin Shelke Patil are the Nagaradhyaksha of Lonand.

Lonand has the MIDC (Maharashtra Industrial Development Corporation) in its vicinity which boasts many industries giving employment to people in the Satara District.

Industries in Lonand: Sona Alloys Pvt. Ltd., Indus Biotech Ltd., Sahyadri Group, Bharat Gears, Privilage Industries, Decimen Control System Pvt. Ltd., Prathmesh Briquate Ltd., Pushpak infracon, and many more.

Education
 Rayat shikshan Sanstha's New English School and junior college(For girl's), Lonand - 
 Vishwajyot International School- CBSE
 Sahyadri Public School Lonand
 Mount Carmel Convent school Lonand
 ￼

Cityscape 
The city boasts many important government offices and other institutions of significance. Major offices and institutions in Lonand are as follows:

 Lonand Nagarparishad Lonand
 Police Station Lonand
 Indiapost office Lonand
 Shaskiya Prathmik Arogya Kendra (Government Hospital)
 Shaskiy Prani Rugnalay (Government Animal Hospital)
 MSRTC Bus Stand
 Government Guest House)
 Talathi Office
 MIDC Lonand
 Malojiraje Vidyalay & Junior College Lonand.
 Sharadchandra Pawar Mahavidyalay Lonand
 New English School Mulinche, Lonand.
 St. ANNS English School Lonand.
 ZP School
 Krishi Utpanna Bajara Samiti Lonand (Market Yard)
 All Government & Private banks
 Maitree Park (Jotiba Nagar)
 Mount Carmel Convent School Lonand

References 

Satara district